Torsh Ap (also Romanized as Torsh Āp) is a village in Dokuheh Rural District, Seh Qaleh District, Sarayan County, South Khorasan Province, Iran. At the 2006 census, its population was 26, in 6 families.

References 

Populated places in Sarayan County